The Bristol Titan was a British five-cylinder air-cooled radial engine, designed and built by the Bristol Aeroplane Company in the late 1920s. Later versions of the Bristol Titan also used a Farman-style reduction gear produced by Gnome-Rhône.

Design and development
The engine was designed as a five-cylinder radial, to use as many parts of the Bristol Jupiter as possible. Cylinders, pistons, articulated connecting rods, crankshaft and other minor parts were interchangeable with the Jupiter.

The major significance of the Titan was that it was licensed to Gnome-Rhône and became the pattern for the Gnome-Rhône 5B and 5K. In 1927 Gnome-Rhône was looking for ways out of its licence agreement with Bristol for the Jupiter engine of 1920 and began to produce the Gnome-Rhône 5B and 5K without royalties.

Gnome-Rhône was not satisfied with simply producing Bristol designs under licence, and started a major design effort based around the mechanics of the Titan engine. The results were introduced in 1927 as the K-series, spanning the  Gnome-Rhône 5K Titan, the seven-cylinder  Gnome-Rhône 7K Titan Major, and the nine-cylinder  Gnome-Rhône 9K Mistral.  With the introduction of the K-series, Gnome-Rhône finally ended royalty payments to Bristol, the Gnome-Rhône 5K being built in much greater numbers than the original Bristol Titan. By 1930 they had delivered 6,000 Jupiters, Mistrals and Titans, making them the largest engine company in France.

Variants
Titan I(1928) - 
Titan IIF Modified valve gear.
Titan II (Special)
Titan IV(1928) - , 0.5:1 reduction gear from Bristol Jupiter.
Gnome et Rhône 5B
Gnome et Rhône 5Ba
Gnome et Rhône 5Bc
Gnome et Rhône 5K Titanlicence-built Titan II, 
Gnome et Rhône 7K Titan Majorenlarged seven-cylinder Titan with many detail improvements, produced by Gnome-Rhône without licence.

Applications
Avro 504N
Bristol Primary Trainer
Bristol Type 110A

Specifications (Titan I)

See also

References

Notes

Bibliography

 Lumsden, Alec. British Piston Engines and their Aircraft. Marlborough, Wiltshire: Airlife Publishing, 2003. .

Aircraft air-cooled radial piston engines
Titan
1920s aircraft piston engines